William Thomas Fish (born 17 February 2003) is an English professional footballer who plays as a centre-back for Scottish Premiership club Hibernian, on loan from Manchester United.

A graduate of Manchester United's youth system, Fish made his first-team debut for the club in a Premier League game in May 2021. He had a loan spell at Stockport County in the 2021–22 season.

Fish has represented England at under-17, under-18 and under-19 levels.

Club career
Fish made his professional debut for Manchester United on 23 May 2021 in their final game of the 2020–21 Premier League season against Wolverhampton Wanderers, coming on as a substitute for Daniel James in a 2–1 win.

On 23 July 2021, Stockport County signed Fish on a season-long loan. On 7 January 2022, Manchester United announced that he had been recalled from Stockport.

On 1 September 2022, Fish joined Hibernian on a season-long loan. He made his debut for Hibernian in a 1–0 defeat to Dundee United on 11 October 2022.

International career
Fish has played youth international football for England at under-17, under-18 and under-19 levels.

In October 2019, Fish scored for the England under-17 team in a defeat against Germany.

On 2 September 2021, Fish made his debut for the England under-19 team during a 2–0 victory over Italy at St. George's Park.

Career statistics

References

External links
Profile at the Manchester United F.C. website

2003 births
Living people
Association football defenders
English footballers
England youth international footballers
Footballers from Manchester
Premier League players
Manchester United F.C. players
Stockport County F.C. players
Hibernian F.C. players
Scottish Professional Football League players